Donald Joseph Marshall Sr. (May 28, 1925August 25, 1991) was a Grand Chief of the Mi'kmaq who lived at Membertou First Nation near Sydney, Nova Scotia. He served as Grand Chief for 27 years, from 1964 until his death in 1991. His son, Donald Marshall Jr., was wrongly convicted of murder and rose to prominence again as the primary petitioner in the landmark Supreme Court of Canada case of R v Marshall [1999] 3 SCR 45 regarding native fishing rights.

See also 
List of Grand Chiefs (Mi'kmaq)
Grand Council (Mi'kmaq)

References

External links 
Photograph of Donald Marshall

Indigenous leaders in Atlantic Canada
1925 births
1991 deaths
Mi'kmaq people